ByteDance Ltd. is a Chinese internet technology company headquartered in Beijing and incorporated in the Cayman Islands.

Founded by Zhang Yiming, Liang Rubo and a team of others in 2012, ByteDance developed the video-sharing social networking services and apps TikTok and Chinese-specific counterpart Douyin. The company is also the developer of the news platform Toutiao. As of June 2021, ByteDance hosts 1.9 billion monthly active users across all of its platforms.

ByteDance has attracted legislative, regulatory, and media attention in several countries over surveillance, privacy, and censorship concerns.

History

Background 
In 2009, software engineer and entrepreneur Zhang Yiming collaborated with his friend Liang Rubo to co-found 99fang.com, a real estate search engine. In early 2012, the pair rented an apartment in Zhongguancun and, along with several other 99fang employees, began developing an app that would use big data algorithms to classify news according to users' preferences, which would later become Toutiao. That March, Yiming and Liang founded ByteDance.

Launch of first apps 
In March 2012, ByteDance launched its first app, called Neihan Duanzi (lit. "profound gags"). This allowed users to circulate jokes, memes, and humorous videos. Before being forced by the Chinese government to shut down in 2018, Neihan Duanzi had over 200 million users.

In August 2012, ByteDance launched the first version of news and content platform Toutiao (头条, lit. "headlines"), which would become their core product.

Expansion 
In March 2016, ByteDance established its research arm, called the ByteDance AI Lab. It is headed by Wei-Ying Ma, the former assistant managing director of Microsoft Research Asia. The same year, the ByteDance AI Lab and Peking University co-developed Xiaomingbot, an AI bot that wrote news articles.

From late 2016 until 2017, ByteDance made a number of acquisitions and new product launches. In December 2016, it invested in the Indonesian news recommendation platform BABE. Two months later, in February 2017, it acquired Flipagram, which was later merged with Musical.ly into TikTok upon the latter's acquisition in November 2017. Other notable acquisitions include the UGC short video platform Hypstar (Vigo Video) in July 2017, and News Republic from Cheetah Mobile in November 2017.

In December 2018, ByteDance sued Chinese technology news site Huxiu for defamation after Huxiu reported that ByteDance's Indian-language news app Helo was propagating fake news.

In March 2021, the Financial Times reported that ByteDance was part of a group of Chinese companies that aimed to deploy technology to circumvent Apple's privacy policies. The following month, ByteDance announced that it had created a new division called BytePlus to distribute the underlying platform of TikTok, so that others may launch similar apps.

In August 2021, ByteDance acquired Pico, an Oculus-like virtual reality startup.

In June 2022, the Financial Times reported on a culture clash at ByteDance's London office that has led to a staff exodus.

Corporate affairs

Management 
Zhang Yiming was ByteDance's chairman and CEO from its founding in 2012 until 2021, when co-founder Liang Rubo took over as CEO.

On 19 May 2020, ByteDance and Disney released an announcement that Kevin Mayer, head of Disney's streaming business, would join ByteDance. From June 2020 to his resignation 26 August 2020, Mayer served as the CEO of TikTok and the COO of ByteDance, reporting directly to the company CEO Zhang Yiming. In 2021, Chew Shouzi, former CFO of Xiaomi, took over as TikTok CEO.

As with many Chinese companies, ByteDance has an internal Chinese Communist Party (CCP) committee with Vice President Zhang Fuping serving as the company's CCP Committee Secretary. In 2018, Zhang Fuping stated that ByteDance should "transmit the correct political direction, public opinion guidance and value orientation into every business and product line."

Funding and ownership 
ByteDance is financially backed by Kohlberg Kravis Roberts, SoftBank Group, Sequoia Capital, General Atlantic, and Hillhouse Capital Group.  As of March 2021, it was estimated to be valued at $250 billion in private trades.

In April 2021, a state-owned enterprise owned by the Cyberspace Administration of China and China Media Group, the China Internet Investment Fund, purchased a 1% stake in ByteDance's main Chinese entity and placed a government official, Wu Shugang, on its board of directors. The Economist, Reuters, and Financial Times have described the Chinese government's stake in ByteDance as a golden share investment.

Partnerships 
ByteDance's China business has a strategic partnership with the Chinese Ministry of Public Security for the ministry's public relations efforts. The partnership also said that ByteDance would work with the Ministry of Public Security in cooperation on unspecified "offline activities." In 2019, ByteDance formed joint ventures with Beijing Time, a publisher controlled by the Beijing municipal CCP committee, and with Shanghai Dongfang, a state media firm in Shanghai. In 2021, ByteDance announced that its partnership with Shanghai Dongfang had never been in operation and was disbanded.

Lobbying 
ByteDance's lobbying efforts in the U.S. are led by Michael Beckerman. According to disclosures filed under the Lobbying Disclosure Act of 1995, ByteDance has lobbied the United States Congress, White House, Department of Commerce, Department of State, and the Department of Defense. ByteDance's lobbying has included hiring K&L Gates, LGL Advisors, and other firms to influence bills such as the United States Innovation and Competition Act, American Innovation and Choice Online Act, and the annual National Defense Authorization Act. In March 2023, Politico reported that the company hired SKDK to lobby amid a possible federal ban of TikTok.

Products

CapCut 
First released to the public in April 2020, CapCut is a video editing software made for beginners.

Douyin 

First released to the public in September 2016, Douyin, previously named A.me, is the Chinese version of TikTok. The application is a short-form video social media platform that differs from its international counterpart version by having more advanced features, such as e-commerce. TikTok and Douyin have almost the same user interface but no access to each other's content. Their servers are each based in the market where the respective app is available.

Lark 

First released to the public in 2019, Lark is ByteDance's enterprise collaboration platform. Lark was originally developed as an internal tool, becoming ByteDance's primary internal communication and collaboration platform, but was eventually made available to external users in certain markets.

TikTok 

First released to the public in September 2017, TikTok is a video-sharing social networking service used to make short-form videos, from genres like dance, comedy, and education. On 9 November 2017, ByteDance acquired Shanghai-based social media start-up Musical.ly for up to US$1 billion. They combined it and prior acquisition Flipagram into TikTok on 2 August 2018, keeping the TikTok name.

Toutiao 

Toutiao, launched in August 2012, started out as a news recommendation engine and gradually evolved into a platform delivering content in various formats, such as texts, images, question-and-answer posts, microblogs, and videos.

In January 2014, the company created the "Toutiaohao" platform to attract more content creators. Later in the year, it added video capabilities. Toutiao used interest-based and decentralized distribution to help long tail content creators find an audience.

In 2017, Toutiao acquired Flipagram. ByteDance would later expand Toutiao's features to include: a missing person alerts project whose alerts have helped find 13,116 missing persons as of June 2020; short-form video platform Toutiao Video, later rebranded as Xigua Video (西瓜视频, also known as Watermelon Video), which hosts video clips that are on average 2–5 minutes long; and Toutiao Search, a search engine.

Xigua Video 

Initially launched as Toutiao Video in 2016, Xigua Video is an online video-sharing platform that features user-created short and mid-length videos and also produces film and television content.

Nuverse 
Initially launched in 2019, Nuverse has launched as a video game publisher company.  The first game launched outside Mainland China was Warhammer 40,000: Lost Crusade in 2021. Later in 2021, Moonton became a subsidiary of Nuverse, after winning the bid, initially set by Tencent.

In 2022, the studio has launched Marvel Snap in October worldwide, after closed alpha testing in the Philippines, and gradually entering open beta with the first country being New Zealand.

Other products and acquisitions 
Gogokid was launched in May 2018 as an online English learning platform for children that provides one-on-one classes with native English speakers. In August 2021, ByteDance announced that the app business will be shuttered and most of Gogokid's staff will be laid off, following new regulations imposed on the after-school tutoring industry in China.
 Moonton was acquired by ByteDance in 2021 and was the developer of the mobile eSports game Mobile Legends: Bang Bang.
 Neihan Duanzi, ByteDance's first app, was shut down in 2018 following a crackdown by the national media regulator.
Party Island (Chinese: 派对岛; pinyin: Pàiduì dǎo) is a social media app that allows users to create avatars, join virtual events like concerts, and chat with other participants. It also has a messaging function within the app, so users can send texts to each other privately and join group chats. It is open to public testing in July 2022.
Resso is ByteDance's "social music streaming app." The platform allows users to highlight and share lyrics, comments and other user-generated content with each other alongside streaming of full-length tracks. Resso says that it has licensing agreements in place with Warner Music Group, Sony Music Entertainment, Merlin and Beggars Group, among others.
TopBuzz was a content platform for videos, articles, breaking news and GIFs. The platform was launched in 2015 and sunsetted in 2020. Former employees reported that TopBuzz was used to push pro-Chinese government messaging to foreign users.

Surveillance and censorship concerns 

ByteDance has garnered public attention over surveillance and privacy concerns as well as allegations that it worked with the Chinese Communist Party (CCP) to censor content on its platforms pertaining to human rights abuses in Xinjiang and other topics deemed sensitive by the CCP. Concern has also been raised over the potential effects, including extraterritorial jurisdiction, of China's National Intelligence Law and Cybersecurity Law on ByteDance and its employees.

Government regulation

China 

In April 2018, China's state media regulator, the National Radio and Television Administration (NRTA), ordered the temporary removal of Toutiao and Neihan Duanzi from Chinese app stores. The NRTA accused Neihan Duanzi in particular of hosting "vulgar" and "improper" content and "triggering strong sentiments of resentment among internet users". The following day, Neihan Duanzi announced it was permanently shutting down. In response to the shutdown, Yiming issued a letter stating that the app was "incommensurate with socialist core values" and promised that ByteDance would "further deepen cooperation" with the authorities to promote their policies. Following the shutdown, ByteDance announced that it would give preference to Chinese Communist Party members in its hiring and increase its censors from 6,000 to 10,000 employees.

In November 2019, the CAC ordered ByteDance to remove "slanderous" information on Fang Zhimin from Toutiao. In April 2020, the CAC ordered ByteDance to take down its office collaboration tool, Lark, because it could be used to circumvent Internet censorship. In January 2021, Chinese regulators fined ByteDance for spreading "vulgar information." In April 2021, ByteDance was among 13 online platforms ordered by the Chinese central bank to adhere to tighter data and financial regulations. The bank stated that ByteDance must conduct comprehensive self-examination and rectification to adhere to the country's laws. In May 2021, the CAC stated that ByteDance had engaged in illegal data collection and misuse of personal information.

In March 2021, the State Administration for Market Regulation fined a ByteDance subsidiary and other companies for antitrust violations.

In April 2022, ByteDance announced that it would report users' content on Toutiao and Douyin that engaged in "historical nihilism" in contradiction of official CCP history.

In November 2022, during the 2022 COVID-19 protests in China, the CAC directed ByteDance to intensify its censorship of the protests.

India 

Citing national security issues the Indian Government banned TikTok along with 58 other Chinese apps on 29 June 2020. The ban was made permanent in January 2021. In March 2021, the Indian government froze ByteDance's bank accounts in the country for alleged tax evasion, which ByteDance disputed.

Taiwan 
In December 2022, Taiwan's Mainland Affairs Council announced that an investigation had been launched into ByteDance on suspicion of operating an illegal subsidiary in the country.

United States

Federal Trade Commission action 
On 27 February 2019, the Federal Trade Commission (FCC) fined TikTok US$5.7 million for collecting information from minors under the age of 13 in violation of the Children's Online Privacy Protection Act in the United States. ByteDance later added a kids-only mode to TikTok which blocks the upload of videos, the building of user profiles, direct messaging, and commenting on other's videos, while still allowing the viewing and recording of content.

In June 2022, FCC Commissioner Brendan Carr described ByteDance as "beholden" to the Chinese government and "required by law to comply with [Chinese government] surveillance demands." Carr called for Apple and Google to remove TikTok from their respective app stores. U.S. senators Mark Warner and Marco Rubio also called for an FCC investigation of TikTok and ByteDance.

Executive orders 

On 3 August 2020, U.S. president Donald Trump set September 15 as the deadline for TikTok, a social media app under ByteDance, to find a US buyer, and he then issued executive orders that would effectively ban TikTok from operating in the country if it is not sold by ByteDance within 45 days.

On 7 August 2020, ByteDance released a statement in response to the executive order banning US companies and individuals from doing business with it, threatening to resort to the American justice system in order to get "fair treatment." On 14 August 2020, Trump issued an executive order mandating that ByteDance divest from all U.S. operations of TikTok within 90 days. On 28 August 2020, the Chinese Ministry of Commerce and the Chinese Ministry of Science and Technology announced that any sale of ByteDance's technology to foreign firms is a matter of "national security" and would require prior approval.

FBI investigation 
In March 2023, Forbes reported that the United States Department of Justice and the Federal Bureau of Investigation opened an investigation into ByteDance over its alleged surveillance of journalists.

References

External links 

 

 
Chinese companies established in 2012
Companies based in Beijing
Information technology companies of China
Chinese brands
Zhongguancun
Multinational companies headquartered in China
Internet properties established in 2012
Online companies of China
Software companies of China
Internet censorship in India